The Monterey Formation is an extensive Miocene oil-rich geological sedimentary formation in California, with outcrops of the formation in parts of the California Coast Ranges, Peninsular Ranges, and on some of California's off-shore islands. The type locality is near the city of Monterey, California.
The Monterey Formation is the major source-rock for  37 to 38 billion barrels of oil in conventional traps such as sandstones. This is most of California's known oil resources.  The Monterey has been extensively investigated and mapped for petroleum potential, and is of major importance for understanding the complex geological history of California. Its rocks are mostly highly siliceous strata that vary greatly in composition, stratigraphy, and tectono-stratigraphic history.

The US Energy Information Administration (EIA) estimated in 2014 that the 1,750 square mile Monterey Formation could, as an unconventional resource, yield about 600 million barrels of oil, from tight oil contained in the formation, down sharply from their 2011 estimate of a potential  15.4 billion barrels. An independent review by the California Council on Science and Technology found both of these estimates to be "highly uncertain." Despite intense industry efforts, there has been little success to date (2013) in producing Monterey-hosted tight oil/shale oil, except in places where it is already naturally fractured, and it may be many years, if ever, before the Monterey becomes a significant producer of shale oil.

The Monterey Formation strata vary. Its lower Miocene members show indications of weak coastal upwelling, with fossil assemblages and calcareous-siliceous rocks formed from diatoms and coccolithophorids. Its middle and upper Miocene upwelling-rich assemblages, and its unique highly siliceous rocks from diatom-rich plankton, became diatomites, porcelainites, and banded cherts.

Shale oil resources and exploitation
The Monterey formation has long been recognized as the primary source of the oil produced from other formations in Southern California; the Monterey itself has been very productive where it is naturally fractured. Since 2011, the possibility that hydraulic fracturing might make the Monterey Shale productive over large areas has gained widespread public attention.

As of 2013 advances in hydraulic fracturing commonly called "fracking," and the high price of oil resulted in spirited bidding by oil companies for leases. Occidental Petroleum and Venoco were reported to have been major players.

A widely cited March 2013 study released by the University of Southern California (USC) estimated that if extensive resource play development of the Monterey through hydraulic fracturing were successful, it could generate as many as 2.8 million jobs and as much as $24.6 billion in state and local taxes. However, observers have pointed out that as of 2012, however large its theoretical potential, no one as yet has succeeded in making the Monterey Shale widely economic through hydraulic fracturing; to date it has been economic only in those limited locations already naturally fractured.

Richard Behl, a geology professor who heads the "Monterey And Related Sediments" (MARS) consortium at California State University Long Beach, said that "The [EIA] numbers probably were overblown, but it was a simple method and had an essence of truth." Compared to other shale oil plays, the Monterey formation is much thicker and more laterally extensive, but also much more geologically complex and deformed. See the linked photos from a field trip to Monterey outcrops at Vandenberg Air Force Base. "To say California geology is complex is an understatement. ... The Monterey play is no slam-dunk." In 2013, Bakken shale-oil pioneer Harold Hamm said  the Monterey "might have a lot of potential, but there are reasons why it’s not being produced."

J. David Hughes, a Canadian geoscientist and Fellow of Post Carbon Institute, published a report in December 2013 analyzing the assumptions behind the EIA's forecast of Monterey tight oil production and the USC's forecast of resulting job and tax revenue growth. He found the EIA report's assumptions on prospective well productivity to be "extremely optimistic," and the total estimate of 15.4 billion barrels of recoverable oil "highly overstated." He also found the USC study's assumption that development of the Monterey shale could increase California oil production as much as seven-fold to be "unfounded," and the economic projections regarding jobs and tax revenue to be "extremely suspect."

Source rock
The Monterey Formation is considered the source of 84% of the oil in known fields of the San Joaquin Basin, a total of 12.2 billion barrels of oil. Of this, 112 million barrels of oil in known fields is produced from the Monterey itself.

The Monterey formation is the source for such giant oilfields as the Kern River, Elk Hills, 
Midway-Sunset Oil Field, and probable source for the overlying North and South Belridge Oil Fields.

History
Monterey Formation oil was discovered at the Orcutt Oil Field in the Santa Maria Basin of Santa Barbara County in 1901. This was quickly followed by other Monterey discoveries nearby, including the Cat Canyon Oil Field and Lompoc Oil Field. Each of these early Monterey discoveries depended on natural fractures in the Monterey.

The Monterey Formation is one of the reservoirs in the Elk Hills Oil Field of Kern County.

Major Monterey production was also discovered in offshore oil fields, such as the South Ellwood Oil Field in the Santa Barbara Channel, and the Point Arguello Field in the Santa Maria Basin.

The North Shafter and Rose oil fields of Kern County, which produce primarily from the Monterey Formation, were discovered in 1983, but attempts to produce the oil have not been highly economic. Some horizontal wells were drilled in the Rose field in the early 2000s, with 2,500-foot lateral lengths and single-stage open-hole fracs; the results were said to be improvements over vertical wells.

Carbon dioxide injection has been tested in the Monterey shale, with mixed results. "The main problem was that the carbon dioxide didn't increase production as much as hoped. ... That could be because the rock formation is so jumbled up, it's hard to find the right spot in which to inject the carbon dioxide."

Oil companies such as Occidental Petroleum are using acidizing to stimulate production in Monterey wells, and other companies are experimenting with proprietary mixes of hydrochloric and hydrofluoric acids. "There's a lot of discussion around the Monterey Shale that it doesn't require fracking, that acidizing will be enough to open up the rock," said Chris Faulkner, chief executive officer of Breitling Oil and Gas.

Opposition and regulation
The Monterey Formation underlies the southern half of the San Joaquin Valley, a prime agricultural region. The possibility of environmental damage has caused some farmers in Kern County to press for close regulation of hydraulic fracturing.

Opponents say that hydraulic fracturing poses risks in the seismically active region.

The California legislature passed a bill regulating fracking in September 2013. Some environmentalists criticised the bill as being too lax. Some environmentalists promised not to rest until fracking is banned completely. Oil industry representatives  criticized the bill as too restrictive. The measure was supported by state Sen. Fran Pavley, author of a fracking bill defeated the previous year. The bill, which Governor Jerry Brown promised to sign, provided for disclosure of chemical used, pre-testing of nearby water wells, and a study on environmental and safety issues to be completed by January 2015. Given the very limited success with fracking the Monterey to date, some find the controversy "much ado about little."  

In Santa Barbara County, Santa Maria Energy LLC (SME) has proposed a total of 136 wells in the Monterey formation that would use cyclic steam injection to produce tight oil. In 2013, the county planning commission  declined its staff's recommendation to approve the project, calling for more study on concerns raised by environmentalists about greenhouse-gas emissions. The County Board of Supervisors approved the proposed project on November 18, 2013 and SME was cited as a model operator and applicant during the proceedings.

See also
Ellwood Oil Field
Goleta, California
Los Angeles Basin
Transverse Ranges

References

External links
 UCMP.Berkeley.edu:  The Monterey Formation of California — from the University of California Museum of Paleontology.

Miocene California
Miocene geology
Geologic formations of California
Petroleum in California
Oil-bearing shales in the United States
Geology of Monterey County, California
Geology of San Luis Obispo County, California
Geology of Santa Barbara County, California
Natural history of the California Coast Ranges
Natural history of the Peninsular Ranges
Natural history of the Transverse Ranges